Federal Route 3214 is an industrial federal road in the Klang Valley region, Selangor, Malaysia.

The Kilometre Zero is located at USJ Interchange.

At most sections, the Federal Route 3214 was built under the JKR R5 road standard, with a speed limit of 90 km/h.

There is one overlap: Shah Alam–Bukit Jelutong (overlaps with E35 Guthrie Corridor Expressway).

Highways
 Jalan Subang–Batu Tiga (Subang–Batu Tiga)
 Shah Alam–Puchong Highway (Shah Alam–Puchong)

References

Malaysian Federal Roads